Bakersfield P.D. is an American television sitcom that aired on Fox from September 14, 1993 until August 18, 1994.

The show was based in the police department of the city of Bakersfield, California. It was shot with naturalistic lighting and without a laugh track. The show's theme song, "Busy Office Rhumba," was written by Mark Mothersbaugh and performed by Brave Combo.

Fox canceled the show after one season, citing low ratings. The cable channel Trio reran the show under its "Brilliant But Cancelled" umbrella.

Cast
Giancarlo Esposito as Det. Paul Gigante
Ron Eldard as Det. Wade Preston
Chris Mulkey as Denny Boyer
Tony Plana as Luke Ramirez
Jack Hallett as Capt. Renny Stiles
Brian Doyle-Murray as Sgt. Bill Hampton

Ratings
 1° Season: #104  – 4.26 rating

Episodes

References

External links
 

1990s American single-camera sitcoms
1993 American television series debuts
1994 American television series endings
Television series by ABC Studios
1990s American police comedy television series
Fox Broadcasting Company original programming
English-language television shows
Culture of Bakersfield, California
Television shows set in Bakersfield, California
Latino sitcoms